Without Limit is a 1921 American silent drama film produced and distributed by Metro Pictures. It was directed by George D. Baker and stars Anna Q. Nilsson. The film is based on the story The Temple of Dusk by Calvin Johnston that was published in The Saturday Evening Post.

A surviving print is held at the British Film Institute (BFI) National Film and Television Archive.

Plot
Based upon a summary in a film publication, a minister's son, David Marlowe (Frazer), gets drunk and marries chorus girl Ember (Nilsson), and then forges a check and flees. Ember then decides to leave the straight and narrow path and charges some gowns to Bunny Fish (Schable), the man her husband had robbed. When she hears that her husband has returned with money to repay his debt, she changes her mind and returns the clothing. Later, when she believes David has killed Bunny Fish because of his attentions towards her, but it turns out that Fish is only slightly hurt. Palter (Lane), owner of the establishment where David first got intoxicated, has become so interested in David's regeneration that he remembers him in his will, and just before he dies he also signs over some bonds to Ember after learning that she has remained true to her husband.

Cast
Anna Q. Nilsson as Ember Edwards
Robert Frazer as David Marlowe
Frank Currier as The Reverend Marlowe
Kate Blancke as Mrs. Marlowe
Charles Lane as Clement Palter
Robert Schable as Bunny Fish
Thomas W. Ross as Charley
Nellie Anderson as The Landlady

References

External links

Lantern slide promotional(Wayback Machine)

1921 films
American silent feature films
Metro Pictures films
Films directed by George D. Baker
Silent American drama films
1921 drama films
American black-and-white films
1920s American films